The 1981–82 Colorado Rockies season was the sixth and final season for the Rockies in Colorado. The franchise would relocate to New Jersey for the 1982–83 season and be renamed the New Jersey Devils. In 1995 the Devils would win the Stanley Cup for the first time in franchise history. The same year, NHL hockey would return to Colorado with the Quebec Nordiques relocating there to become the Avalanche, for the  1995–96 season. They went on to become Stanley Cup champions in their first season in Denver.

Offseason

NHL Draft

Regular season

Final standings

Schedule and results

Player statistics

Regular season
Scoring

Goaltending

Note: GP = Games played; G = Goals; A = Assists; Pts = Points; +/- = Plus/minus; PIM = Penalty minutes; PPG=Power-play goals; SHG=Short-handed goals; GWG=Game-winning goals
      MIN=Minutes played; W = Wins; L = Losses; T = Ties; GA = Goals against; GAA = Goals against average; SO = Shutouts;

Farm teams

References
 
 Rockies on Hockey Database

Colorado Rockies (NHL) seasons
Colorado
Colorado
Colorado Rockies
Colorado Rockies